Nitrobacter alkalicus is a nitrite-oxidizing bacteria from the genus of Nitrobacter.

References

Nitrobacteraceae
Bacteria described in 1999